"Make Me Proud" is a hip hop song by Canadian recording artist Drake, released as the third single from his second studio album, Take Care, featuring rapper Nicki Minaj. It was released as a digital download on October 16, 2011 and impacted rhythmic radio on October 25, 2011 in the U.S.

Background
Drake released "Make Me Proud" on his OVO blog on October 13, 2011 and earlier tweeted the song's title on September 25, 2011. The song premiered on Funk Master Flex's radio station Hot 97.

Live performances
It was performed for the first time on Saturday Night Live, which aired on October 15, 2011 which also aired. Minaj has performed her verse on her debut concert tour, the Pink Friday Tour, as well as her Pink Friday: Reloaded Tour.

Chart performance
On October 20, 2011, the song debuted at number 97 on the Billboard Hot 100. In its second week, it peaked at number nine on the chart. With this jump from 97–9 on the Billboard Hot 100, Drake tied Akon's 88-spot blast (95-7) with "Smack That," featuring Eminem, five years before, for biggest vault ever by a male artist on the chart. Overall, the leap of "Make Me Proud" is currently tied for the sixth largest jump of all-time on the chart. In its 15th week on the chart, the track climbed to the peak of the Billboard R&B/Hip-Hop Songs chart, becoming Drake's 8th track to peak atop of that chart in his two and a half year career. "Make Me Proud" also topped the Billboard Rap Songs chart, giving Drake the most number one rap singles of all time with 11. As of December 2014, "Make Me Proud" has sold 1.4 million copies in the United States.

Track listing
 Digital single

Charts

Weekly charts

Year-end charts

Certifications

Release history

See also
 List of number-one R&B singles of 2012 (U.S.)
 List of number-one rap singles of 2012 (U.S.)

References

2011 singles
Drake (musician) songs
Nicki Minaj songs
Cash Money Records singles
Song recordings produced by T-Minus (record producer)
Songs written by Drake (musician)
Songs written by Nicki Minaj
Songs written by Nikhil Seetharam
Songs written by 40 (record producer)
Songs written by T-Minus (record producer)
Songs written by Anthony Palman
2011 songs